The Cape Romain National Wildlife Refuge is a 66,287 acre (267 km²) National Wildlife Refuge in southeastern South Carolina near Awendaw, South Carolina. The refuge lands and waters encompass water impoundments, creeks and bays, emergent salt marsh and barrier islands.    are designated as Class I Wilderness. Most of the refuge is only accessible by boat. The Intracoastal Waterwayway passes the Refuge.  Mainland facilities include the refuge's headquarters and visitor center which are located on U.S. Highway 17 about 30 minutes by car from Charleston, South Carolina.

Red wolf
In the 1800s the red wolf was abundant in the Southeastern United States including South Carolina. However, by the mid-1960s, efforts of trappers, hunters, and farmers— combined with the destruction of natural habitat— nearly wiped out the population. Only a few wolves remained in Texas and Louisiana. To protect the red wolf, they were taken into captivity, and by 1980, were extinct in the wild. Within the decade, captors of the red wolf were looking to reestablish the red wolf's territory. In 1987, red wolves were released in Alligator River National Wildlife Refuge in eastern North Carolina, Bull Island in South Carolina, Horn Island in Mississippi, and St. Vincent Island in Florida.

Birds and turtles
Established in 1932 as a haven for migratory birds, Cape Romain National Wildlife Refuge is additionally managed for the protection of threatened and endangered species such as the loggerhead sea turtle, wood stork, and piping plover.  Every year loggerhead sea turtles bury their eggs on three of the refuge's barrier islands.  The refuge supports approximately 23% of the northern subpopulation of loggerhead sea turtles, the largest north of Florida.  For the past 30 years refuge employees have helped loggerhead turtles survive by identifying nests that are in areas subject to overwash and inundation, and moving them to a safer area on the island.

Lighthouse Island
Cape Romain National Wildlife Refuge is the site of two surviving historic lighthouses which still remain on the refuge, both on Lighthouse Island.  The Cape Romain Lighthouses are on the National Register of Historic Places.

Bulls Island

Bulls Island is at  the largest of the barrier islands that are part of the refuge. A regular ferry service to Bulls Island is provided by a private charter service at Garris Landing. The Island was the site of a third lighthouse, Bulls Bay Light which was deactivated in 1913 and lost to the sea years ago. The island also has Boneyard Beach, a beach where a forest has been encroached on by the sea.

Sewee Visitor & Environmental Education Center
The Sewee Center features displays about the various ecosystems, wildlife and heritage of the South Carolina Lowcountry. Exhibits include the marine ecosystems of the Cape Romain National Wildlife Refuge and the forest Center. Other facilities include a classroom/lab, an auditorium with an orientation film, information station, a book store, picnic area and trails.  The Center is jointly operated by the U.S. Fish and Wildlife Service and the U.S. Forest Service, and offers nature education programs and activities.

The South Eastern Wildlife and Environment Education Association (SEWEE Association) is the Friends Group for the Cape Romain National Wildlife Refuge and for the Francis Marion National Forest.  The SEWEE Association supports the education and conservation activities for the refuge and the forest.

References

External links 
 Cape Romain National Wildlife Refuge Official Site
 Sewee Visitor & Environmental Education Center
 Cape Romain Facebook Page

Protected areas of Charleston County, South Carolina
National Wildlife Refuges in South Carolina
Nature centers in South Carolina
Protected areas established in 1932
Biosphere reserves of the United States
Wetlands of South Carolina
Landforms of Charleston County, South Carolina